The Waimea River is a tributary of the Mataura River in Southland, New Zealand. The Waimea Plains around this river form part of the Southland Plains.

Rivers of Southland, New Zealand
Rivers of New Zealand